Manuel Ignacio de Vivanco Iturralde (15 June 1806 – 16 September 1873) was a Peruvian politician and military leader who served as the President of Peru from 1843 to 1844. He was born in Lima, Peru. He led part of the Peruvian forces in the campaign against the reunification of Peru-Bolivian Confederacy.

During the second administration of Agustín Gamarra, he was appointed prefect of Arequipa. In 1843, he rebelled against Juan Francisco de Vidal, but was defeated and fled to Bolivia. He returned to Peru then and subsequently became president in 1843 under the title "Supreme Director of the Republic".

In the name of president Juan Antonio Pezet he signed the Vivanco–Pareja Treaty on 27 January 1865, which was one cause of the Chincha Islands War. From April to September 1865, he served as Prime Minister of Peru. He also served as Peruvian representative in Chile.

See also
 Politics of Peru
 List of presidents of Peru

References

Further reading
 Basadre, Jorge. Historia de la República del Perú. Vol. 3 (1963)
 Quiroz, Alfonso W. "Manuel Ignacio Vivanco" in Encyclopedia of Latin American History and Culture, vol. 5, p. 429. New York: Charles Scribner's Sons 1996.
 Wu, Celia. Generals and Diplomats: Great Britain and Peru, 1820-40. (1991)

1806 births
1873 deaths
Peruvian people of Spanish descent
People from Valparaíso
Presidents of Peru
People of the Chincha Islands War